Shwetha may refer to:
 Swetha river, an Indian river in Tamil Nadu
 Shweta, a given name (including a list of people with the name)

See also 
 Swetha Vinayagar Temple a Hindu temple situated in Tamil Nadu's state.